Octet is a ballet made by New York City Ballet balletmaster in chief Peter Martins to Mendelssohn's Octet in E-flat major (1825). The premiere took place November 14, 2003 at the Royal Danish Ballet, Copenhagen; the NYCB premiere was November 23, 2004, at the New York State Theater, Lincoln Center.

Original casts

Royal Danish Ballet  
  
Silja Schandorff
Yao Wei

Andrew Bowman
Kristoffer Sakurai

NYCB  
  
Ashley Bouder
Darci Kistler

Benjamin Millepied
Stephen Hanna

Reviews 
NY Times, Anna Kisselgoff, November 25, 2004

Articles 
NY Times, Rebecca Milzoff, August 20, 2006

Ballets by Peter Martins
New York City Ballet repertory
2003 ballet premieres
Ballets to the music of Felix Mendelssohn